White King may refer to:

 The White King chess piece
 White King (Through the Looking-Glass), a character from Lewis Carroll's fantasy novella Through the Looking Glass
 White King (comics), a number of comics characters
 White King, a brand of household bleach marketed by Symex
 Weisskunig, The White King , a romanticized autobiography by Maximilian I, Holy Roman Emperor
The prophecy of the White King, prophecy revived by William Lilly 1644
The White King, award winning Hungarian novel by György Dragomán
 The White King (film), a film produced in the United Kingdom